Rennes City Hall is the seat of the city council in the French city of Rennes. It has been classed by the French government as a monument historique since 1962.

History
The baroque building was designed by Jacques Gabriel, who was tasked with rebuilding many building in Rennes after a fire in 1720. Gabriel chose to break with the past and build a new city worthy of the Age of Enlightenment. The city hall was placed on a newly built square. The south wing held the council and the north wing held a court, while in the middle there was a bell tower with a statue of Louis XV, which would be destroyed during the French Revolution. The statue of the monarch was in honour of his support for rebuilding the city.

From 1840 to 1855, the Faculty of Sciences at the University of Rennes was based in the north wing, hosting academics such as the chemistry professor Faustino Malaguti. Emmanuel Le Ray refurbished the City Hall in the early 20th century, including the Panthéon rennais memorial to the victims of the First World War. The names of great French generals are inscribed on the ceiling, though the name of Philippe Pétain – later the head of state of the collaborationist Vichy France – has been removed.

The niche where the statue of Louis XV stood was later occupied by a Jean Boucher sculpture of Anne of Brittany, the last sovereign ruler of the duchy, marrying Charles VIII of France. On 7 August 1932, during festivities for the 400th anniversary of the Union of Brittany and France, it was destroyed by a bomb laid by Breton nationalists; nothing has since replaced it on the plinth.

References

City and town halls in France
Buildings and structures in Rennes
Monuments historiques of Ille-et-Vilaine
Baroque architecture in France
Buildings and structures completed in 1743
18th-century architecture in France